Humains is a French horror film directed from Pierre-Olivier Thévenin and Jacques-Olivier Molon. The film stars Sara Forestier, Dominique Pinon and Philippe Nahon.

Plot

A French research team travels to the Swiss Alps to investigate a discovery. After a car accident, the group becomes lost in the mountains with a group of tourists and struggle to survive while being hunted by mysterious figures.

Cast
 Lorànt Deutsch as Thomas
 Sara Forestier as Nadia
 Dominique Pinon as Gildas
 Philippe Nahon as Professor Schneider
 Manon Tournier as Elodie
 Élise Otzenberger as Patricia
 Christian Kmiotek as Paulo

Production
The film was shot in late 2008 in Luxembourg, Paris and the Swiss Alps under the working title of "Les Disparus de Lötschental". Yolande Moreau was originally cast in the lead role as the character Charlotte, but she left the project. As a result, the character's role was changed and became Sara Forestier's character, Nadia.

Release
The film premiered on 6 February 2009 as part of the European Film Market in Germany and was part of the Brussels International Fantastic Film Festival on 11 April 2009. The French cinema release was on 22 April 2009.

Reception

The film grossed only $236,617 in its opening week in France and was universally panned by critics. It is the only film to be reviewed on Nanarland.com in its first week.

Soundtrack
The score was composed by Luxembourg cinema composer Gast Waltzing.

References

External links 
 

2009 horror films
2009 films
Films shot in France
Films shot in Luxembourg
Films shot in Paris
Films shot in Switzerland
2000s French-language films
French horror films
Luxembourgian horror films
Swiss horror films
French-language Swiss films
French-language Luxembourgian films
2000s French films